Leopoldo José Martínez Nucete (born October 16, 1964) is a Venezuelan-American lawyer, writer, and politician. He was previously a member of the Democratic National Committee and an opposition deputy in the National Assembly of Venezuela. Martinez is the current nominee to become the United States Executive Director of the Inter-American Development Bank.

Early life, education and academic activities 
Martínez Nucete graduated as a lawyer from the Andrés Bello Catholic University (UCAB) and received two LL.M. degrees from Harvard University (1989) and University of Miami (2008). In addition, he is a Mid-Career Fellow (MCF '96) in International Studies and Economic Policy from the School of Public and International Affairs at Princeton University. He was also Professor of Law at the UCAB in Venezuela, and a Visiting Scholar at Harvard Law School in 1995. In 1996 he published his first book "Democracia Económica" (Princeton Academic Press, 1996) and lately 94 Paradoxes to Consider in the 21st. Century (Editorial Dahbar, 2019).

Career

Venezuelan politics
Martínez Nucete began his political career with the Democratic Action (Acción Democrática) party, which has an international affiliation with Socialist International, together with the majority of social democratic parties in Europe and worldwide. Like most social democratic parties in other countries, in Venezuela Acción Democrática was key in establishing democracy, leading the struggle against the right wing authoritarian dictatorship of General Marcos Pérez Jiménez, as well as defeating (through the decisive actions of democratically elected governments) the incursion of communists "guerrillas" in Venezuela, during the 60s. Martínez Nucete grandparents José Nucete Sardi and Leopoldo Martínez Olavarria were closely connected to the foundation and democratic struggles protagonized by Acción Democrática; and his father, businessman Bernardo Martínez Acosta, was a high level official under the Presidencies of Carlos Andrés Pérez and Jaime Lusinchi, both from Acción Democrática.

In the parliamentary elections of 2000, Leopoldo Martínez was elected as an independent Assembly member supported by an alliance between the Governor of the State of Miranda Enrique Mendoza with various electoral movements and the Primero Justicia party. His relation with Primero Justicia ended as a result of being called to occupy the position of Minister of Finance in the "de facto" government that was intended to be formed after the coup d'état of April 2002. However, Martínez never accepted that position. As a result of these events, Leopoldo Martínez sat in parliament as an independent until 2005, resuming his ties to Acción Democrática. During his tenure as a member of the Assembly, Martinez Nucete was vocal and fearless in denouncing what he considered the authoritarian trends of the Chavez government, as well as its reckless management of the economy and corruption.

Between the years of 2002 and 2005 members of Chavez' parliamentary fraction petition the Supreme Court to authorize the impeachment of Martinez Nucete as a conspirator and traitor of the national interest. Their request was dismissed by the Supreme Court on April 25, 2005 (Judgement 13, case 2002-00074), but without prejudice, leaving the window open for future political persecution. Therefore, Martinez has forced to flee the country with his family, to avoid further personal persecution; which had already included the confiscation by the government of some of his family assets. After years of successful litigation efforts against this confiscation, the process was ended in 24 hours, adverse to the Martinez Family, with an irregular ruling of the Constitutional Chamber of the Supreme Court which, in their Judgement 1863 on December 19, 2014 (case 14–1342), returned the asset to the control of the government.

American politics
Martínez Nucete became a U.S. citizen and resides in McLean, Virginia, where he is the CEO of the Center for Democracy and Development of the Americas (CDDA/IQLatino) publishers of IQLatino, and serves as a board member and chair of the National Committee (after being the first chairman of the board) of the Latino Victory Project.

In 2018, Tom Pérez appointed him to the national leadership of the Democratic National Committee and he also served as Finance Chair of the DNC's Hispanic Caucus and one of the DNC National Finance Committee Deputy Chairs. Leopoldo Martínez also was a member of the Steering Committee and Central Committee of the Democratic Party of Virginia. Given his leadership roles with Latino Victory, Martinez Nucete has supervised or advised the work of such organization in the presidential campaigns of Hillary Clinton (2016) and Joe Biden (2020); and in more than 50 political campaigns of candidates for the United States Congress or Senate, as well as candidates for Governor or legislators in States such as Virginia, Maryland, Pennsylvania, New York, Florida, California, Texas, New Mexico, Nevada and Arizona.

He was appointed by the Governor Terry McAuliffe to be Commissioner for Small Business in the Commonwealth of Virginia, and was a member of the Transition Commission between the McAuliffe and Ralph Northam administrations. Martínez Nucete also served on the board of directors of the University of Mary Washington. As a board member of the university he served as the chair of the Administration, Finance, Advancement and Facilities Committee, and a member of the Audit and Executive Committees. Recently, the Sorensen Institute at the University of Virginia appointed Leopoldo Martinez Nucete to their Board of Advisors. The Sorensen Institute, under the leadership of Leopoldo Martinez Nucete with support from CDDA/IQ Latino, created the Jose Nucete Sardi Fellowships, to increase Latino participation in the institute's programs.

Inter-American bank nomination
On August 10, 2021, President Joe Biden nominated Martinez to be the United States executive director of the Inter-American Development Bank. Hearings were held before the Senate Foreign Relations Committee on December 14, 2021. The committee deadlocked on the nomination in a party-line vote on March 29, 2022. The opposition against Martinez was led by Senator Ted Cruz (R-TX), alleging Martinez Nucete was a member of the "hard left" when in Venezuela, claims which were debunked by Senators Bob Menendez (D-NJ) and Tim Kaine (D-VA), major national Latino organizations, and the national press. On January 23rd, 2023 President Biden renominated Martinez Nucete for this position before the 118th Congress. The newly elected Senate, with an expanded Democratic majority will soon reconsider his nomination to become the U.S. Executive Director at the Inter-American Development Bank.

References

Harvard Law School alumni
Andrés Bello Catholic University alumni
University of Miami School of Law alumni
Democratic Party (United States)
1964 births
Living people
People from Caracas
People from McLean, Virginia
University of Mary Washington people